The Mayor of Ōpōtiki officiates over the Ōpōtiki District of New Zealand which is administered by the Ōpōtiki District Council (ODC). The ODC was formed by the amalgamation of the Opotiki County Council and the Opotiki Borough Council, as part of the local government reforms in 1989. The current Mayor of Ōpōtiki is David Moore.

Don Riesterer (died February 2019), who was mayor from 1989 to 2001, was the father of Lyn Riesterer, who became mayor in October 2019 and served for one term.

List of mayors
Mayors of Ōpōtiki District have been:

References

Opotiki
Opotiki
Ōpōtiki District
Ōpōtiki